The Men's Slalom LW4 was one of the events held in Alpine skiing at the 1988 Winter Paralympics in Innsbruck.

There were 20 competitors in the final.

Switzerland's Paul Fournier set a time of 1:16.42, taking the gold medal.

Results

Final

References 

Slalom